Alcanzar una estrella is the soundtrack to the telenovela Alcanzar una estrella. It was released in 1990 and contains the first two opening songs for the telenovela "Quiero estar contigo", and "La mujer que no soñe", as well as the closing song "Alcanzar una estrella".

The third opening song "Contra tu cuerpo", performed by Mariana Garza, would not be released until 1992 on the Mas que alcanzar una estrella film soundtrack.

The hit singles off this album were "Alcanzar una estrella" and "La mujer que no soñe".

Track listing

 "Alcanzar una estrella" – Mariana Garza
 "Quiero estar contigo" – Eduardo Capetillo
 "Reencarnación" – Cita
 "Deseos intimos" – Eduardo Capetillo & Mariana Garza
 "Ya ni hablar" – Eduardo Capetillo
 "Rock, rap de la carcel"
 "La mujer que soñe" – Eduardo Capetillo - 3:11
 "Las calles obscuras" – Cita
 "Voy a cambiar por ti" – Hector Suarez Gomis
 "Éxito Y Amor" – Eduardo Capetillo
 "Maldicion gitana" – Marcos Valdes
 "Tu eres un sueño para mi" – Mariana Garza

1990 albums